Ashley Owens is an American Paralympic swimmer.

Biography
Owens participated in the 2004 Summer Paralympics in Athens, Greece where she won one gold and one bronze medal at the age of 14 for swimming. Four years later in Beijing, China she got awarded with one gold and one silver medal for 100 meter freestyle in S10 category. In 2006, she set a new Pan-American record in the 1500 meter freestyle which let her participate in IPC Swimming World Championships which was hosted in Durban, South Africa. During the same year she also got a silver medal for 50 meter freestyle and four gold ones (one of which was for medley). In 2008, she graduated from Stockbridge High School and during the same year got into first place in U.S. Paralympic Swimming Trials which were hosted in Minneapolis, Minnesota. During the same year she also set world record in two freestyles; One was 200 metre while the other one was 400 meter, all of which were Can-Am Championships and were hosted at Victoria, British Columbia. Two years later she competed in Eindhoven, Netherlands where she got another gold medal in 400 meter freestyle swim following by another silver one for the same sport in the same year. She is a graduate of Stockbridge High and of Catawba College where she studied psychology.

References

Date of birth missing (living people)
Living people
Catawba College alumni
Paralympic swimmers of the United States
Paralympic gold medalists for the United States
Paralympic silver medalists for the United States
Paralympic bronze medalists for the United States
Medalists at the 2004 Summer Paralympics
Swimmers at the 2004 Summer Paralympics
Medalists at the 2008 Summer Paralympics
Swimmers at the 2008 Summer Paralympics
American female medley swimmers
American female freestyle swimmers
American female swimmers
S10-classified Paralympic swimmers
Year of birth missing (living people)
Medalists at the World Para Swimming Championships
Paralympic medalists in swimming
21st-century American women